Adrian Jardine (born 23 August 1933) is a British sailor. He won a bronze medal in the 5.5 Metre class at the 1968 Summer Olympics together with Robin Aisher and Paul Anderson.

References

External links
 
 

1933 births
Living people
Sportspeople from Salisbury
British male sailors (sport)
Olympic sailors of Great Britain
Sailors at the 1964 Summer Olympics – 5.5 Metre
Sailors at the 1968 Summer Olympics – 5.5 Metre
Olympic bronze medallists for Great Britain
Olympic medalists in sailing
Medalists at the 1968 Summer Olympics